UnHerd is a British news and opinion website founded in July 2017.

Content
UnHerd was founded in 2017 by conservative British political activist Tim Montgomerie, who also acted as editor. Following Montgomerie's departure in September 2018, journalist Sally Chatterton, who previously wrote for The Daily Telegraph and The Independent, took over as editor. Freddie Sayers joined the magazine in 2019 as executive editor, having previously been editor-in-chief of YouGov and founder of the British news and current affairs website Politics Home. , the website lists 23 staff.

Its columnists include Giles Fraser, Justin Webb, Carl Miller, Ed West, Tanya Gold, John Gray, James Bloodworth, Matthew Goodwin, Maurice Glasman, Julie Bindel, Meghan Murphy, Michael Tracey, Douglas Murray, Paul Embery, Kathleen Stock and Ian Birrell.

In March 2020, UnHerd launched a YouTube channel named LockdownTV, taking its name from the lockdowns implemented around the same time period. The channel posts interviews conducted by Sayers.

The website initially existed without a paywall, as it is funded by an endowment from British investor Paul Marshall. In 2017, New Statesman reported that the site intended to introduce paid services. In May 2020, the site said that it intended to switch to a subscription model later that year. As of November 2022, it offers readers a limited number of articles for free.

In January 2023, former Politico and The Atlantic writer Tom McTague was hired as UnHerds political editor.

Reception
When the site was launched in July 2017, Simon Childs in Vice was critical of the underlying premise, saying: "The social media news cycle can be a jading stream of ill-informed narcissists, but it's refreshing to be reminded that at least it offers a more diverse outlook than Tim Montgomerie funded by an oligarch publishing the kind of people who are generally 'unheard' because people edge away from them at parties." Jasper Jackson writing for the New Statesman was also skeptical of UnHerds promotion of slow journalism, saying "the idea UnHerd is offering a groundbreaking solution to information overload is faintly ludicrous."

In 2020, Ian Burrell, writing in the i, noted that UnHerd pieces can run to 2,000 words in length, presenting multiple sides of an argument and pursuing an "approach to digital journalism [that] is counter to the notion that only extreme views can generate traffic"; he compared the website to Tortoise Media, another "slower-paced news experiment that defies the catch-all notion of the media." Later that year, in a piece on the media's lack of diversity, Burrell noted Guardian journalist Suzanne Moore's claim on UnHerd that she had been "forced out of The Guardian for challenging its consensus on feminism and transgender rights. Headlined 'Why I had to Leave The Guardian', the piece was subtitled: 'If you were bullied by 338 colleagues, what would you do?'"

In 2021, an UnHerd piece criticising the World Health Organization (WHO) for dismissing the COVID-19 lab leak theory in its investigation was marked by Facebook with a "false information" tag; Facebook apologised after UnHerd objected. Reporting the incident, the Financial Times noted that three days later the White House expressed "deep concerns" about the WHO investigation.

In February 2022, the New Statesman and The Times reported on an UnHerd piece by another Guardian journalist, Hadley Freeman, in which she suggested her paper was allowing itself to be bullied over transgender issues. Later that year, Conor Friedersdorf in The Atlantic featured an UnHerd piece by Paul Kingsnorth as "Provocation of the Week". Kingsnorth argued that "Left-modernism is now the outlook of the professional managerial classes, the top 10% or so of society, and—not coincidentally—the beneficiary class of globalisation. ... Meanwhile, a national populist movement built largely around a working- and lower-middle-class reaction to this ideology is coalescing ... Why would the middle classes be further to the 'Left' than the workers?"

In July 2022, UnHerd reported that a Ukrainian government body set up to counter misinformation had compiled a list of politicians and intellectuals in multiple countries who they believed were promoting Russian propaganda, sparking coverage in publications including Newsweek and The Indian Express. The list included senator Rand Paul, former congresswoman Tulsi Gabbard, military and geopolitical analyst Edward Luttwak, realist political scientist John Mearsheimer, and journalist Glenn Greenwald, as well as the former chair of the Indian National Security Advisory Board. The UnHerd report included responses from Luttwak, Mearsheimer, and Greenwald.

References

External links
 

British political websites
British news websites
British political blogs